The MC-1000 CCE Color Computer was a home computer produced in Brazil by CCE (Indústria e Comércio de Componentes Eletrônicos S/A) and released in February 1985.  The machine shares some heritage with the GEM 1000 (advertised in Belgium) and the Rabbit RX83, systems produced in Hong-Kong by the firm "Rabbit computers”. The machine was sold up to 1986.

History
The MC-1000 was released In Brazil, in a market already saturated with cheap machines with very similar features. As such, it did not attract much attention even though it was touted as a "Brazilian computer". The fact that it was not a "clone" of similar 8-bit systems (like the Apple, the TRS-80 or even the Sinclair Spectrum) certainly did not contribute to its popularity.

In addition to the poor design and "Chiclet keyboard", the MC-1000 had only 16 KB of RAM (small, even by the standards of 1983). Like the Sinclair Spectrum, the BASIC commands (which were similar to the Apple IIs Applesoft BASIC) were typed by pressing a single key.

GEM 1000 and Rabbit RX83 "clones/predecessors" 

The GEM 1000 Junior Computer, also known as the French Charlemagne 999 was an even more obscure (than the MC-1000), low cost toy Home computer for children from 5 years upwards, produced in Taiwan by Rabbit Computers of Hong Kong.  It was part of a family consisting of GEM 1000, GEM 2000, GEM 3000 and GEM 4000 systems.  In addition to the poor design and "Chiclet keyboard", the GEM 1000 had only 16 KB of RAM (small, even by the standards of 1983). Like the Sinclair Spectrum the commands of the BASIC (similar to the Apple 2's Applesoft BASIC) were typed by pressing a single key. The French Charlemagne 999 system used a version of this BASIC that used French instead of English keywords. The Rabbit RX83 had such little memory, just 2K, that many of the video modes of its "clones" could not be used — it had just the 32×16 8 colors text mode, and 128×64 graphics  with 2 background and 3 foreground colors. It was launched at the 1983 edition of the Consumer Electronics Show costing just US$99.

Technical specifications (MC-1000)
 CPU: Zilog Z80A, 3.57 MHz
 Memory: 16 KB RAM expandable to 64 KB; 8 KB ROM; up-to 6 KB VRAM
 Keyboard: 50-key rubber Chiclet keyboard
 Display: Motorola MC6847 (32×16 text (8 colors), 128×64, 128×96, 128×192, 256×192 graphics (2 background, 3 foreground colors))
 Sound: AY-3-8910 (3 voices and white noise)
 Ports: interface cassette recorder 1200BPS, TV output connector, joystick

Emulation
Like similar early home computers, the MC-1000 can be emulated on modern machines.

References

Computers designed in Brazil
Computer-related introductions in 1985
Goods manufactured in Brazil
Home computers
Products introduced in 1985
Z80-based home computers